George Wesley Lowe [″Doc″] (April 25, 1895 – September 2, 1981) was a relief pitcher in Major League Baseball who played for the Cincinnati Reds during the  season. He was born in Ridgefield Park, New Jersey.

Career
Lowe was a major league player whose career, statistically speaking, was only slightly different than that of Eddie Gaedel or Moonlight Graham.

On July 28, 1920, Lowe debuted with Cincinnati in the eight inning of a game against the Brooklyn Robins. In two innings of work, he did not allow a run while giving up one hit and walking one. He did not strike out any and did not have a decision, recording a perfect 0.00 earned run average, but never appeared in a major league game again.

He also played in parts of four minor league seasons between 1914 and 1920, posting a 43–40 record in 107 pitching appearances.

Lowe died in Somers Point, New Jersey, at the age of 86.

Sources

External links

Major League Baseball pitchers
Cincinnati Reds players
Asheville Tourists players
Newburgh Hillclimbers players
Springfield Hampdens players
Springfield Ponies players
Baseball players from New Jersey
People from Ridgefield Park, New Jersey
Sportspeople from Bergen County, New Jersey
1895 births
1981 deaths